Yangtze Delta Universities Alliance is an alliance of eight prestigious research universities located in East China. It was established in 2005.

List of 8 Universities

References 

College and university associations and consortia in Asia
Higher education in China
Universities and colleges in China
Engineering universities and colleges in China
Professional associations based in China
Educational institutions established in 2005
2005 establishments in China